Beth Nielsen Chapman (born September 14, 1958) is an American singer and songwriter who has written hits for country and pop music performers. She was inducted into the Nashville Songwriters Hall of Fame in 2016. Nielsen Chapman is two-time Grammy Award and ACM Award nominee and won the Country Music Association Award for Song of the Year in 1999 for writing Faith Hill's "This Kiss".

Early life and history 
Beth Nielsen Chapman was born on September 14, 1958, in Harlingen, Texas, as the middle child of five to a Catholic family, an American Air Force Major father and a nurse mother. While Chapman was growing up, her family moved several times and settled in Alabama in 1969. While living in Germany at age 11, Chapman started playing guitar after her mother hid a Framus guitar as a Father's Day gift in her room. She also learned to play the piano at the same time she started playing guitar. As a child and teenager, she listened to a variety of music including Hoagy Carmichael, Tony Bennett, James Taylor and Carole King.

In 1976, Chapman played with a rock and pop group called "Harmony" in Montgomery, Alabama, effectively replacing Tommy Shaw who had just left to join Styx.  She played acoustic guitar and piano as well as providing vocals for the group in a locally-popular bowling alley bar called Kegler's Kove and has returned to play in the area on an infrequent basis ever since.

Career success as songwriter 
Chapman had several popular songs on the Adult Contemporary charts in the 1990s, such as "I Keep Coming Back to You", "Walk My Way", and "All I Have".  In 1993, she sang a duet with Paul Carrack, "In the Time It Takes".

Co-songwriter of Faith Hill's hit song "This Kiss", Chapman has written songs performed by numerous artists including Trisha Yearwood ("Down On My Knees", "You Say You Will", "Trying to Love You"), Martina McBride ("Happy Girl"), Willie Nelson ("Nothing I Can Do About It Now", "Ain't Necessarily So", "If My World Didn't Have You"), Tanya Tucker ("Strong Enough to Bend"), Lorrie Morgan ("Five Minutes"), Mary Chapin Carpenter ("Almost Home"), Jim Brickman and Rebecca Lynn Howard ("Simple Things"), Alabama ("Here We Are"), Suzy Bogguss ("Save Yourself"), Claudia Church ("What's the Matter With You Baby"), Holly Dunn ("You Say You Will"), Crystal Gayle ("When Love is New"), Highway 101 ("All the Reasons Why", "Long Way Down"), Terri Clark ("Sometimes Goodbye"), Mindy McCready ("One in a Million"), Waylon Jennings ("Shine On Me", "Old Church Hymns and Nursery Rhymes"), Ilse DeLange ("World of Hurt"), Megan McKenna ("Far Cry from Love"), Juice Newton ("The Moment You Were Mine"), Bette Midler ("The Color of Roses"), and (co-written) Michael W. Smith ("She Walks With Me" on This Is Your Time).

Several artists have performed with Chapman on her albums: Bonnie Raitt on "Heads Up for the Wrecking Ball" and "Shake My Soul"; Vince Gill on "Deeper Still"; Amy Grant on "Thanks to Spring"; John Prine on "Every December Sky"; Michael McDonald on "Right Back Into the Feeling" and "Will and Liz"; Emmylou Harris and Kimmie Rhodes on "There's a Light"; Paul Carrack on "In the Time It Takes"; and her son Ernest Chapman III on "Your Love Stays".

Chapman performed at the 2nd Annual "Women Rock! Girls and Guitars" special on Lifetime, singing backing vocals with Emmylou Harris, performing with the ensemble on a cover version of Take It To The Limit, and on "There's a Light" with Emmylou Harris, Pat Benatar, Sheryl Crow and Shea Seger singing back-up.

Some of Chapman's songwriting collaborators have been Annie Roboff, Bill Lloyd, Eric Kaz, Harlan Howard, Joe Henry. and Judie Tzuke.

Charting singles 
In her native country, Chapman has never made the Hot 100 chart as a recording artist, although she charted eight singles on the Billboard Top Adult Contemporary Singles chart. She is tied for first place (with Marilyn Maye) as the artist with the most charted Adult Contemporary hits without ever reaching the Billboard Hot 100, according to the Billboard Top Adult Contemporary Hits book.

Chapman also charted one song on the Billboard Bubbling Under The Hot 100 Chart. "Sand and Water" reached Number 2 on the Bubbling Under chart, a position often listed as No. 102 on the Hot 100 in various Billboard singles books.

She is a significantly more successful chart artist in Canada, where she scored three Top 40 hits on the national RPM chart in the early 1990s. Her biggest Canadian hit was "The Moment You Were Mine", which reached #23 in 1993.

Recent recordings 
Chapman's album, Back to Love, was released in the United Kingdom on January 25, 2010, and in the United States on May 25, 2010. The album contained 11 new compositions. The single "Even As It All Goes By" closed out 2009 as BBC Radio 2's "Record of the Week" and was the only new single added to the "A list" of BBC Radio 2's playlist at the end of 2009. Additionally, Back To Love was BBC Radio 2's "Album of the Week" starting on January 18, 2010. The album Liv On was released on October 7, 2016, for digital download and on CD the following week. It features Olivia Newton-John and Amy Sky in songs about loss and moving on from grief. Chapman, Newton-John and Sky toured across Canada, the U.S., the U.K. and Ireland in 2017 in support of the album, performing mainly in smaller, more intimate venues. Her most recent album, Hearts of Glass, was released in 2018 and is available on CD, as an MP3 download or as a digital download.

Personal life 
Chapman's husband, Ernest Chapman, died of cancer in 1994. In 2000, she experienced her own battle with breast cancer. The song "Sand and Water" was written after Ernest's death; Elton John performed this song during his 1997 world tour. The song was featured on the episode "Sand and Water" in Season 7 of ER (2000), as well as in the Season 1 episode "Dead Man Dating" of the TV series Charmed in October 1998. 

She has one son, Ernest (born 1981), who is also a musician and has performed with her. In 2008, she got engaged to be married to psychologist and photographer Bob Sherman while living in Nashville, Tennessee. This engagement was the inspiration for her album Back to Love. In January 2011, Chapman married Sherman, after a decade-long courtship. On December 9th 2022 Bob Sherman died from leukaemia.

Discography

Albums

Singles

Music videos

Contributions 
Mother & Child (1995) – "Ave Maria"
Time and Love: The Music of Laura Nyro (1997) – "Stoney End"
Song of America (2007) – "Sometimes I Feel Like a Motherless Child"

References

External links 

 
 

1958 births
Living people
American country guitarists
American country singer-songwriters
American women country singers
American pop pianists
People from Harlingen, Texas
Reprise Records artists
Singer-songwriters from Texas
Guitarists from Texas
20th-century American guitarists
20th-century American pianists
Country musicians from Texas
21st-century American pianists
21st-century American women pianists
20th-century American women guitarists